Hermannloewia is a genus of tephritid  or fruit flies in the family Tephritidae.  It is currently considered a synonym of Notomma.

References

Trypetinae